Rachel Laudan (born 1944) is a food historian, an author of the prizewinning Cuisine and Empire: Cooking in World History.

Early life 
Laudan grew up on a traditional family farm in South West England. Her father was Cambridge-educated and his opinion of farming as “the highest calling” could well have been carried by his daughter as she moved through life. Laudan’s mother was the traditional image of a farmer’s wife and cooked three meals a day for the family and the farm workers, every day of the year. This idyllic picture was noted by Laudan in an interview with The Austin Chronicle in 2013 where she comments “It created drudgery for my mother”. Her mother cooked everything from scratch and despite Laudan not being forced to help her mother cook, or her father with the farm-work, she grew up surrounded by the food processes of farm to fork. A much repeated memory during interviews with Laudan tell of her father experimenting with grinding wheat to make his own flour. He removed the husks and then attempted to grind the grains by pounding with a pestle and mortar, followed by feeding the wheat through a meat grinder and eventually striking it with a hammer on a flagstone floor.

However, Laudan was drawn more towards history as a subject, which she attributes to her awareness of "living in history" while growing up. From finding flints and artefacts from Roman times scattered around the farm to playing in the cloisters of Salisbury Cathedral, Laudan felt connected to the history around her. Consequently, after time spent in Nigeria with the Voluntary Service Overseas at the age of 18, she returned to study Geology at Bristol University. Moving to University College London she attained her Ph.D. in History and Philosophy of Science in 1974.

Career 
Moving across the Atlantic, Laudan started her academic career teaching history of science and technology, social and economic history and world history. Initially teaching at Carnegie-Mellon, she also taught at the University of Pittsburgh, Virginia Tech and then the University of Hawaii. While living on the Island, Laudan was struck by the interconnected cuisines that created the fusion of local food and subsequently went on to write her first non-academic book The Food of Paradise which was published by the University of Hawaii in 1996. Despite being rejected by several cautious publishers the book was awarded the 1997 Jane Grigson/ Julia Child prize of the International Association of Culinary Professionals. In 1996, Laudan and her husband the philosopher Larry Laudan, both retired from academia and moved to Mexico. However, they both continued to visit America, Argentina and Spain as visiting lecturers. During her time in Mexico, Laudan worked on the ambitious task of writing her next book Cuisine and Empire: Cooking in World History which was published in 2012. Like her previous book it became an award-winning publication, gaining the IACP Cookbook Award for Best Book in Culinary History.

References 

Food historians
Food scientists
Living people
British women historians
American women historians
20th-century English historians
20th-century American historians
21st-century English historians
21st-century American historians
20th-century British women writers
20th-century American women writers
21st-century British women writers
21st-century American women writers
Alumni of the University of Bristol
Alumni of University College London
Carnegie Mellon University faculty
University of Pittsburgh faculty
Virginia Tech faculty
University of Hawaiʻi faculty
1944 births